The Two Holy Mosques Architecture Exhibition is located in Um al-Joud area, near the Kiswa Factory. Since its establishment it has become one of the most popular destinations in Makkah, Saudi Arabia. It was established in February 2000 during the late King Fahd bin Abdulaziz era.

Objective 
The main aim of the exhibition is to give the Muslim community an overall information on the history of unique architectural designs of the two holy mosques.

Exhibits 

The museum holds a large number of exhibit items, some of these are listed below:

 Wooden Pillar of Kaaba: dating back to circa 65 AH, installed during the reign of Abdullah b. al-Zubayr.
 Mizab Rehma: a water spout of Kaaba dating back to 1021 AH, bearing the name of Sultan Mahmud Khan.
 Kaaba’s Wooden Ladder: dates back to 1240 AH, 
 Door of the Kaaba: dates back to 1363 AH, 
 Models of the Two Holy Mosques: detailed models of Masjid al-Nabawi and Masjid al-Haram.
 A number of Manuscripts

References 

Mecca Province
2000 establishments in Saudi Arabia
Tourist attractions in Saudi Arabia
Tourist attractions in Mecca